Wij, Alexander is a 1998 Dutch television series directed by Rimko Haanstra, son of Bert Haanstra, and broadcast by the KRO. 
Eight episodes at 45 minutes were shot.

Cast 
 Jacques Commandeur as Patiënt nr. 4
 Hugo Haenen as Dokter Jan Giltay
 Hilde Heijnen as Catharina Wauters
 Thekla Reuten as Eveline Roëll
 Rik van Uffelen as Professor De Vreeze
 Kees Hulst as Verduyn
 Tom Jansen as Professor De Zwaan
 Jack Wouterse as Verpleger Rinus Vermeer
 Brenda Bertin as Geertje
 René Eljon as Karel
 Arjan Kindermans as Scholten
 Jeroen Willems as Dokter van Leeuwen
 Carine Crutzen as Koningin Sophie
 Porgy Franssen as Koning Willem III
 René van Asten as Secretaris Van Dijck
 Huib Broos as Koning Willem II
 Rob van Reyn as Jantje (Lakei in inrichting)
 Noepie van der Poll as Buurmeisje van Eveline

External links 
 

1990s Dutch television series
1998 Dutch television series debuts
Dutch drama television series